St Martin's Church is a Church of England parish church in the town of Chipping Ongar in Essex, England.

History
The church dates from the 11th century and is a Grade I listed building

References

Chipping Ongar
Chipping Ongar
St Martin's Church